No Nose Job: The Legend of Digital Underground is the first compilation album from the rap group, Digital Underground. It features several of their songs, such as "Same Song" and "The Humpty Dance".

Track listing
"The Humpty Dance"
"Freaks Of The Industry"
"Doowutchyalike"
"Same Song"
"The Way We Swing"
"Packet Man"
"Dope-A-Delic (Do-U-B-Leeve-In-D-Flo)"
"No Nose Job (ultafunk Remix)"
"Kiss You Back"
"The Return Of The Crazy One" 
"Wussup With The Love"
"Carry The Way (Along Time)"
"Flowin' On The D Line"
"Doo Woo You"

2001 compilation albums
Digital Underground albums
Tupac Shakur